The Mayor of Yonkers is the official head and chief executive officer of the city of Yonkers, New York.

List of mayors of Yonkers 
 Mike Spano (2012–present)
 Phil Amicone (2004–2011)
 John Spencer (1996–2003)
 Terence M. Zaleski (1992–1995)
 Henry Spallone (1990–91)
 Nick Wasicsko (1988–1989)
 Angelo R. Martinelli (1982–1987)
 Gerry Loehr (1980–81)
 Angelo R. Martinelli (1974–1979)
 Alfred DelBello (1970–1973)
 Dr. James Francis Xavier O’Rourke (1966–1969)
 John E. Flynn (1962–1965)
 Kristen Kristensen (1950–1961)
 Edith P. Welty (1949)
 Curtiss E. Frank (1944–1949)
 Joseph F. Loehr (1930s) 
William A Walsh, Sr. (1925–1927)
 James T. Lennon (1910–1918)
 Nathan A. Warren (1907–1909)
 John H. Coyne (1905–1907)
 John Emory Andrus (1903–1905)
 Michael J. Walsh (1901–1903)
 Leslie M. Sutherland (1897–1901)
 John G. Peene (1894–1897)
 James H. Weller (1892–1894)
 James Millward (1890–1892)
 J. Harvey Bell (1886–1890)
 William G. Stahlnecker (1884–1886)
 Samuel G. Swift (1882–1884)
 Norton P. Otis (1880–1882)

In popular culture 
 The 1999 book and 2015 miniseries Show Me a Hero detail a white middle-class neighborhood's resistance to a federally mandated scattered-site public housing development in Yonkers.

References

External links 
 

Yonkers, New York
Mayors of Yonkers, New York